Friedrich Wilhelm Leopold Konstantin Quirin Freiherr von Forcade de Biaix, aka Friedrich Wilhelm Leopold Konstantin Quirin von Forcade de Biaix, Herr of Schleibitz, Hamm, Groß-Naedlitz and Loslau, aka the Baron von Forcade,  (  – ), Royal Prussian Major, Knight of the Iron Cross 2nd Class on 26 August 1813, knighted by His Majesty Frederick William III of Prussia as Knight of the Order of Saint John (Bailiwick of Brandenburg) (Balley Brandenburg des Ritterlichen Ordens Sankt Johannis vom Spital zu Jerusalem) in 1817, Royal Prussian Chamberlain (Kammerherr) and Castellan (Drost) of Neuenrade in the County of Mark, after his father's death in 1808. He was also a publisher, author, and theater director.

Military career 

Born in Brieg, Silesia, he followed the military tradition of his family, and:

 1797, entered Prussian military service in the 23rd Prussian Infantry Regiment.
 1804, discharged from Prussian military service.
 1804, his Majesty Frederick William III of Prussia awarded him office of Royal Chamberlain.
 1806, Standesherr in Loslau
 1808, inherited the office of Castellan of Neuenrade in the County of Mark upon his father's death.
 1813, responded to the general call-up and mobilization of military reservists and Landwehr, and reentered Prussian military service.
 1813, helped organize and train six Companies of Landwehr.
 26 August 1813, recognized for his heroic actions defending the so-called Red House at Strehlen near Dresden against a vastly superior enemy during the Battle of Dresden.
 1813-1815, participated in the Campaigns of 1813-1815 during the War of the Sixth Coalition as a captain and company commander of the 8th Silesian Landwehr Infantry Regiment.
 1817, his Majesty Frederick William III of Prussia awarded him Knight of the Order of Saint John (Bailiwick of Brandenburg).
 Captain in the Gendarmerie in Breslau
 1825, awarded the Knight of the Iron Cross 2nd Class for his heroic actions defending the so-called Red House against a vastly superior enemy during the Battle of Dresden on 26 August 1813.
 1832, took his retirement.
 1840, died in Breslau, Silesia

Family

Coat of arms

The family motto of the Prussian branch is "In Virtute Pertinax.

Coat of Arms: An escutcheon with the field divided into four parts. Left half: argent tincture, a gules lion holding a sinople eradicated oak tree between its paws; azure tincture charged with three or mullets; Right half: a gules castle with three towers on an argent tincture; sinople tincture charged with three argent roses below it. A Grafenkrone (Count's coronet) as helmut on top of the escutcheon, crested with a or fleur-de-lis. Two or lions supporting the escutcheon. Motto: "In Virtute Pertinax".

Heraldic Symbolism: The lion symbolizes courage; the eradicated oak tree symbolizes strength and endurance; the towers are symbols of defense and of individual fortitude; the mullets (5-star) symbolizes divine quality bestowed by god; the rose is a symbol of hope and joy; the fleur-de-lis is the floral emblem of France; the coronet is a symbol of victory, sovereignty and empire. A Count's coronet to demonstrate rank and because the family originally served the counts of Foix and Béarn during the English Wars in the Middle Ages.

Parents
His father was Friedrich Heinrich Ferdinand Leopold von Forcade de Biaix (1747-1808), a Royal Prussian Lieutenant Colonel, recipient of Kingdom of Prussia's highest military order of merit for heroism, Knight of the Order of Pour le Mérite and Castellan (Drost) of Neuenrade in the County of Mark.

He married in 1782 at Ossen Manor in Oels, Silesia, to Wilhelmine von Koshembahr und Skorkau (1762-????), from the house of Ossen. She was the daughter of Christian Leopold von Koschembahr und Skorkau, Herr of Ober- and Nieder-Ossen, Pühlau, Dörndorf and Jacobsdorf, and his 2nd wife Charlotte Wilhelmine Wutge von Wutgenau.

Marriage
Friedrich Wilhelm Leopold Konstantin Quirin von Forcade de Biaix married at the Rittergut Peuke in Oels county on 26 November 1804 with Amalie Ernestine Wilhelmine Elisabeth von Poser und Gross-Naedlitz, from the house of Peuke (* 25 November 1785, Rittergut Peuke, Oels; † 11 September 1818, Waldenburg near Breslau), the daughter of Johann Gottlieb Sylvius von Poser und Groß-Naedlitz, Herr of Perschau and Domsel (1739-1817), a Royal Prussian lieutenant colonel and aide-de-camp to Frederick William III of Prussia, and his 4th wife, Amalie Johanna Henriette Helene von Loeben (1762-1823).

Children
The couple had had at least five daughters, but by the time his wife died in 1818, only one daughter was still alive. The family line extinguished in 1840 without a son to carry it on.

 Adelheid von Forcade de Biaix (* 23 October 1805 at Schleibitz Manor, Oels; † 4 July 1808, Schleibitz Manor, Oels)
 Emilie von Forcade de Biaix (* 13 October 1806 at Schleibitz Manor, Oels; † 23 July 1808, Groß-Nädlitz near Breslau, Lower Silesia)
 Johanne von Forcade de Biaix (* 29 December 1807 at Groß-Nädlitz near Breslau, Lower Silesia; † 10 June 1810, Schleibitz Manor)
 Amalie Wilhelmine Henriette Ernestine Bianca von Forcade de Biaix (* 27 July 1811 at Schleibitz Manor, Oels, Silesia; † 16 April 1880, Lauban, Silesia). She married 17 January 1832 at Krakowahne Castle, Trebnitz County in Silesia with Heinrich Sylvius Friedrich Adolf von Randow, Herr of Pangau (* 25 January 1807, Oels, Silesia; † 29 September 1859, Rio de Janeiro, Brazil), Royal Prussian Captain in the Artillery and a professional engineer (railways), who emigrated in 1853 to Brazil.

 an unnamed daughter (* 13 March 1818, Klein Ullersdorf), who died an infant.

Other family
 Brother: Wilhelm Friedrich Erdmann Ferdinand von Forcade de Biaix (1786-1816), Imperial Russian Army Lieutenant, Adjutant to Imperial Russian Army Infantry General Loggin Ossipovitch Rot ("von Roth"), recipient of the Kingdom of Prussia's highest military order of merit, Knight of the Order of Pour le Mérite (26.5.1814). He was reported as Missing in Action and presumed dead in 1816.
 Brother: Friedrich Wilhelm Ferdinand Ernst Heinrich von Forcade de Biaix aka Ferdinand Heinrich von Forcade de Biaix (1787-1835), Royal Prussian Major, Commanding Officer of the 10th Prussian Division's Garrison Company and Knight of the Iron Cross 2nd Class.

Titles and offices 
Historical terms, in particular those related to offices, titles and awards, are often outdated in their usage to the point that modern dictionaries no longer contain them. To understand their meaning in the present day context it is necessary to look into dictionaries from the period. Historical terms in German used in the production of this article, and their English definitions, include:

Drost zu Neuenrade
Castellan of Neuenrade

 Drost (der): synonym with "Landdrost", "Landshauptmann" and "Landsvogt"; a Lord Seneschal, a governor of a certain part of a country, an Upper Bailiff, a Castellan See: Ebers, Johann, The New And Complete Dictionary Of The German And English Languages: composed chiefly after the German Dictionaries of Mr. Adelung and of Mr. Schwan / 1: ... Containing the Letters A - G of the German Alphabet explained in English, Leipzig 1796, Page 618 (in German and English)

Kammerherr
Chamberlain

 Kammerherr (der): a Chamberlain; see also Kammerer See: Ebers, Johann, The New and Complete Dictionary of the German and English Languages: composed chiefly after the German Dictionaries of Mr. Adelung and of Mr. Schwan / 2: ... Containing the Letters H–R of the German Alphabet explained in English, Leipzig 1796, p. 284 (in German and English)

Notes

References 
 Blažek, Konrad: J. Siebmacher's grosses und allgemeines Wappenbuch in einer neuen, vollständig geordneten und reich vermehrten Auflage mit heraldischen und historisch- genealogischen Erläuterungen; Sechsten Bandes Achte Abtheilung. Der abgestorbene Adel der Preussischen Provinz Schlesien. Dritter Theil, Nürnberg 1894, Page 131 & Page 267 Table 85. (in German)
 Champeaux, Joseph de: Devises, cris de guerre, légendes, dictons, Dijon 1890, Page 105. (in French)
 Preußen: Handbuch über den Königlich Preußischen Hof und Staat für das Jahr 1839, Berlin 1839, Page 10 (in German)
 Zedlitz-Neukirch, Leopold von: Neues preußisches Adelslexicon oder genealogische und diplomatische Nachrichten von den in der preussischen Monarchie ansässigen oder zu derselben in Beziehung stehenden fürstlichen, gräflichen, freiherrlichen und adeligen Häusern mit der Angabe ihrer Abstammung, ihres Besitzthums, ihres Wappens und der aus ihnen hervorgegangenen Civil- und Militärpersonen, Helden, Gelehrten und Künstler: E - H, Band 2, 1836, pp. 179–180. (in German)
 Zedlitz-Neukirch, Leopold von: Neues preußisches Adelslexicon oder genealogische und diplomatische Nachrichten von den in der preussischen Monarchie ansässigen oder zu derselben in Beziehung stehenden fürstlichen, gräflichen, freiherrlichen und adeligen Häusern mit der Angabe ihrer Abstammung, ihres Besitzthums, ihres Wappens und der aus ihnen hervorgegangenen Civil- und Militärpersonen, Helden, Gelehrten und Künstler: P - Z, Band 4, 1837, pp. 390–392. (in German)

Further reading
 Archiv der Stiftung Zentralstelle für Personen- und Familiengeschichte, Berlin-Dahlem
 Danty, Pierre: Revue de Pau et du Béarn, Une famille béarnaise au service de la Prusse : les Forcade-Biaix, La Société des Sciences Lettres et Arts de Pau et du Béarn, 1978, Nr. 6, pp. 269–272. (in French)
 Ebers, Johann, The New And Complete Dictionary Of The German And English Languages: composed chiefly after the German Dictionaries of Mr. Adelung and of Mr. Schwan / 1: ... Containing the Letters A–G of the German Alphabet explained in English, Leipzig 1796 (in German and English)
 Ebers, Johann, The New And Complete Dictionary Of The German And English Languages: composed chiefly after the German Dictionaries of Mr. Adelung and of Mr. Schwan / 2: ... Containing the Letters H–R of the German Alphabet explained in English, Leipzig 1796 (in German and English)
 Ebers, Johann, The New And Complete Dictionary Of The German And English Languages: composed chiefly after the German Dictionaries of Mr. Adelung and of Mr. Schwan / 3: ... Containing the Letters S–Z of the German Alphabet explained in English, Leipzig 1796 (in German and English)
 Gieraths, Günther: Die Kampfhandlungen der brandenburgisch-preussischen Armee, 1626-1807, Band 8, Berlin 1964, pp. 79 & 111. (in German)
 Kneschke, Ernst Heinrich: Neues allgemeines Deutsches Adels-Lexicon, Band 3, Leipzig 1861, pp. 293–294. (in German)
 König, Anton Balthasar: Biographisches Lexikon aller Helden und Militairpersonen, welche sich in Preußischen Diensten berühmt gemacht haben: A–F, Band 1, pp. 429–432. (in German)
 Komander, Gerhild H. M.: Der Wandel des "Sehepuncktes". Die Geschichte Brandenburg-Preußens in der Graphik von 1648 bis 1810. Münster 1995, pp. 310–311. (in German)
 Kroener, Bernhard: Potsdam: Staat, Armee, Residenz in der preussisch-deutschen Militärgeschichte (in German).
 Ledebur, Leopold von: Allgemeines Archiv für die Geschichtskunde des Preußischen Staates, Band 17, Berlin 1835, Page 43. (in German)
 Priesdorff, Kurt von: Soldatisches Führertum, Band 1, Hamburg 1937, pp. 354–356, Nr. 371. (in German)
 Schöning, Kurd Wolfgang von: Die Generale der chur-brandenburgischen und königlich preussischen Armee von 1640–1840. (Chronologische Uebersicht der Brandenb. Preuss. Generalität seit 1640.) Eine historische Uebersicht, sammt vielen eingewebten urkundlichen Notizen als Jubelschrift dem vaterländischen Kriegesheere geweiht, Page 71, Nr. 364. (in German)
 Wendt, Dr. Johann (General-Sekretair).: Jahresbericht der Schlesischen Gesellschaft für Vaterländische Kultur, Uebersicht der Arbeiten und Veränderungen schlessichen Gesellschaft für vaterländifche Cultur im Jahre 1830. Allgemeiner Bericht über die Arbeiten unp Veränderungen der Gesellschaft in verfloßnen Jahren 1830, vorgetragen in der allgemeinen Sitzung den 17. Dezember., Die Schlesischen Gesellschaft für Vaterländische Kultur, Graß, Barth und Comp., Breslau 1831, p. 17. (in German)
 Wendt, Dr. Johann (General-Sekretair).: Jahresbericht der Schlesischen Gesellschaft für Vaterländische Kultur, Uebersicht der Arbeiten und Veränderungen schlessichen Gesellschaft für vaterländifche Cultur im Jahre 1837. Allgemeiner Bericht über die Arbeiten unp Veränderungen der Gesellschaft in verfloßnen Jahren 1837, vorgetragen in der allgemeinen Sitzung den 15. Dezember., Die Schlesischen Gesellschaft für Vaterländische Kultur, Graß, Barth und Comp., Breslau 1838, pp. 16, 24, 67, 176, 222. (in German)
 Wendt, Dr. Johann (General-Sekretair).: Jahresbericht der Schlesischen Gesellschaft für Vaterländische Kultur, Uebersicht der Arbeiten und Veränderungen schlessichen Gesellschaft für vaterländifche Cultur im Jahre 1840. Allgemeiner Bericht über die Arbeiten unp Veränderungen der Gesellschaft in verfloßnen Jahren 1840, vorgetragen in der allgemeinen Sitzung den 18. Dezember., Die Schlesischen Gesellschaft für Vaterländische Kultur, Graß, Barth und Comp., Breslau 1841, p. 16. (in German)

1784 births
1840 deaths
Barons of Germany
Kingdom of Prussia
Military History of Prussia
Military of Prussia
People from Prussian Silesia
People of the Napoleonic Wars
Prussian nobility
Recipients of the Iron Cross (1813)
Silesian nobility